Ernest Earl Miller (September 12, 1905 – June 20, 1936) was a professional ice hockey player who played 110 games in the National Hockey League with the Chicago Black Hawks and Toronto Maple Leafs between 1927 and 1932. With Toronto Miller won the Stanley Cup in 1932. He was born in Regina, Saskatchewan. He is the uncle of Bill Hay.

Playing career
A native of Lumsden, Saskatchewan, Miller played the position of Left Wing for teams in the NHL, IHL, Can-Pro, PRHL, N-SJHL, and the N-SSHL hockey leagues. Miller played for the Saskatoon Nutana from 1923 to 1924, University of Saskatchewan from 1924 to 1926, Saskatoon Sheiks from 1926 to 1928, Chicago Blackhawks from 1927 to 1932, Kitchener Flying Dutchmen from 1928 to 1931, London Tecumsehs from 1930 to 1931, Pittsburgh Yellowjackets from 1931 to 1932, Toronto Maple Leafs from 1931 to 1932, Syracuse Stars from 1932 to 1935, Buffalo Bisons from 1934 to 1936, and the Rochester Cardinals from 1935 to 1936. Miller retired from playing hockey in 1936. On June 20, 1936, Miller was found dead in a field in Regina, Saskatchewan, at the age of 30. No foul play was involved but no exact cause of death was ever released.

Career statistics

Regular season and playoffs

See also
 List of ice hockey players who died during their playing career

References

External links
 

1905 births
1936 deaths
Buffalo Bisons (IHL) players
Canadian ice hockey forwards
Chicago Blackhawks players
Ice hockey people from Saskatchewan
Kitchener Flying Dutchmen players
London Tecumsehs players
Pittsburgh Yellow Jackets (IHL) players
Rochester Cardinals players
Saskatchewan Huskies ice hockey players
Sportspeople from Regina, Saskatchewan
Stanley Cup champions
Syracuse Stars (IHL) players
Toronto Maple Leafs players